The Arnold Palmer Cup is an annual team golf competition for college/university golfers. From 2018 it has been contested between a United States team and an International team representing the rest of the world. The teams consist of 12 men and 12 women. The teams are selected on the basis of nationality, not according to the location of the players' universities.

The 2023 event will be held from June 10 to 12 at Laurel Valley Golf Club, near Ligonier, Pennsylvania.

History
From its foundation in 1997 until 2017 the event was only contested by men. From 1997 until 2002 the United States played Great Britain & Ireland while from 2003 to 2017 the United States played a European team. Many of the European players attended American universities as sports scholarships have never been a feature of the university system in Europe. Until 2016, the event was known as the Palmer Cup.

From 1997 until 2013 the match was contested between eight-man teams. There were four four-ball matches, four foursome matches, and two sets of eight singles matches for a total of 24 points. From 2014 the teams were increased from eight to ten with five four-ball matches, five foursome matches, and two sets of ten singles matches for 30 points overall. The order of the four sessions has varied with the match being played over either two or three days.

From 2018 it has been contested between a United States team and an International team representing the rest of the world. The teams consist of 12 men and 12 women.

Results

Of the 26 matches, the United States team has won 13, the International/European/Great Britain and Ireland team has won 12, with 1 match tied.

Michael Carter award
The Michael Carter Award was inaugurated in 2002. On February 13, 2002, former Penn State University golfer Michael Carter died in an automobile accident at the age of 19. "The Michael Carter “Junior” Memorial Award is presented to the Arnold Palmer Cup participant from each team who best represents the qualities and ideals that made this young man unique."

Former participants 

The following competitors have subsequently played in either the Ryder Cup or the Presidents Cup:
Daniel Berger,
Kevin Chappell,
Ben Curtis,
Luke Donald (2),
Rickie Fowler,
Lucas Glover (2),
Bill Haas (2),
J. J. Henry,
J. B. Holmes,
Dustin Johnson,
Chris Kirk,
Matt Kuchar (2),
Hunter Mahan,
Graeme McDowell (2),
Francesco Molinari,
Thomas Pieters,
Webb Simpson,
Brandt Snedeker,
Justin Thomas (2),
Oliver Wilson (3).

See also
Walker Cup
NCAA Division I Men's Golf Championships
NCAA Division II Men's Golf Championships
NCAA Division III Men's Golf Championships

References

External links

 
Team golf tournaments
Amateur golf tournaments
College golf in the United States
Recurring sporting events established in 1997
1997 establishments in Florida